Siebe Wylin (born 27 May 2003) is a Belgian footballer who plays as a defender for Belgian First Division A club KV Oostende.

Career
Wylin was born in and grew up in Roeselare. He played youth football for Club Brugge from under-8 up to under-16 level before he joined the under-18 team of KV Oostende in 2019. He made his senior debut on 2 October 2021 as a substitute in a 1–1 draw with Sint Truiden.

References

2003 births
Living people
Belgian footballers
People from Roeselare
Association football defenders
Club Brugge KV players
K.V. Oostende players
Belgian Pro League players
Footballers from West Flanders